South West France, or in French Sud-Ouest, is a wine region in France covering several wine-producing areas situated respectively inland from, and south of, the wine region of Bordeaux. These areas, which have a total of 16,000 hectares (40,000 acres) of vineyards, consist of several discontinuous wine "islands" throughout the Aquitaine region (where Bordeaux region itself is situated), and more or less to the west of the Midi-Pyrénées region. 

Thus, South West France covers both the upstream areas around the rivers Dordogne and Garonne (which also flow through Bordeaux where they combine to form the Gironde estuary) and their tributaries, as well as the wine-producing areas of Gascony including Béarn, and the  Northern Basque Country. However, only areas closer to the Atlantic than to the Mediterranean are included in the region, with the city of Toulouse being situated roughly halfway between the South West wine region and the Languedoc-Roussillon wine region on the Mediterranean.

The brandy-producing region Armagnac is situated within Gascony and the wine region of South West France, and some of its grapes are used to make Vin de Pays under the designation Vin de Pays de Côtes de Gascogne or mixed with Armagnac to produce the mistelle Floc de Gascogne.

South West France is a rather heterogeneous region in terms of its wines and how they are marketed. It is rare to see wines being sold as Vins du Sud-Ouest. Rather, the smaller areas and individual appellations market their wines under their own (smaller) umbrella, in contrast with common practice in e.g. the Bordeaux region.

The areas closest to Bordeaux produce wines in a style similar to those of Bordeaux, and largely from the same grape varieties. Further south, wines are still rather similar to those of Bordeaux, but several grape varieties not used in Bordeaux are common, such as Tannat. Finally, in the areas closest to the Pyrenees, wines are made from local varieties, such as Gros Manseng and Petit Manseng.

History
The south-west region was first cultivated by the Romans and had a flourishing wine trade long before the Bordeaux area was planted. As the port city of Bordeaux became established, wines from the "High Country" would descend via the tributaries of the Dordogne and Garonne to be sent to markets along the Atlantic coast. The climate of the inland region was generally warmer and more favorable than in Bordeaux, allowing the grapes to be harvested earlier and the wines to be of a stronger alcohol level. Many Bordeaux wine merchants saw the wines of the "High Country" as a threat to their economic interest and during the 13th & 14th century a set of codes, known as the police des vins, were established which regulated the use of the port of Bordeaux for wine trading. The police des vins stated that no wine could be traded out of Bordeaux until the majority of Bordelais wine had already been sold. This had a devastating effect on the wine industry of the High Country with barrels of wines being stranded at Bordeaux warehouses for several weeks or months before they could be sold at much lower prices due to that year's market already being saturated with wine. In many years another vintage would actually take place before the "High Country" wines were sold.

Appellations in South West France

South West France includes the following Appellation d'Origine Contrôlée (AOC) and Vin Délimité de Qualité Supérieure (VDQS) designations.

Dordogne/Bergerac, subregion
 Bergerac AOC
 Côtes de Duras AOC
 Côtes de Montravel AOC
 Haut-Montravel AOC
 Monbazillac AOC
 Montravel AOC
 Pécharmant AOC
 Rosette AOC
 Saussignac AOC

Garonne subregion
 Brulhois AOC
 Buzet AOC
 Cahors AOC
 Côtes de Duras AOC
 Côtes du Marmandais AOC
 Fronton AOC
 Gaillac AOC
 Marcillac AOC
 Coteaux du Quercy VDQS
 Côtes de Millau VDQS
 Saint-Sardos VDQS
 Vins de Lavilledieu VDQS
 Vins d'Entraygues et du Fel VDQS
 Vins d'Estaing VDQS

Gascony and Pyrenean subregions 
Gascony lands are close to the Adour river, Béarn and Basque lands are closer to the Pyrenees

Gascony lands 
 Saint-Mont VDQS
 Tursan VDQS

Gascony and Béarn lands 
 Madiran AOC
 Pacherenc du Vic-Bilh AOC
 Pacherenc du Vic-Bilh Sec AOC

Béarn lands 
 Béarn AOC
 Jurançon AOC

Basque Country land 
 Irouléguy AOC

Common grape varieties 
The following grape varieties are commonly found in at least one sub-region or appellation of South West France.

 Abouriou
 Arrouya noir
 Arrufiac
 Baco blanc
 Bouchalès
 Cabernet Franc
 Cabernet Sauvignon
 Clairette blanche
 Colombard
 Courbu
 Duras
 Fer
 Folle blanche
 Gros Manseng
 Jurançon
 Len de l'El
 Malbec
 Merlot
 Muscadelle
 Négrette
 Petit Manseng
 Portugias bleu
 Raffiat de Moncade
 Sauvignon blanc
 Sémillon
 Tannat
 Ugni blanc

See also
 French wine

References

External links 
 Official website of the South West France wine organisation CIVSO, which covers the Garonne and Gascony subregions
 Wine Tours In South West France, covering local grape varieties and regions such as Brulhois and Armagnac
 South West France wines

Wine regions of France